Wat Sam Phraya is a khwaeng (subdistrict) in Phra Nakhon District, Bangkok.

Geography
Wat Sam Phraya is an area outside Rattanakosin Island or Bangkok's old town zone. It is named after the local temple Wat Sam Phraya and it is the location of the district office. "Bang Khun Phrom" is another unofficial name for it collectively with the subdistrict adjacent to Bang Khun Phrom.

Wat Sam Phraya is the part on the northwestmost of the district. It is bounded by other subdistricts (from north clockwise): Wachiraphayaban in Dusit District (Khlong Phadung Krung Kasem is the dividing line), Bang Khun Phrom and Ban Phan Thom in its district (Samsen Road is the dividing line), Chana Songkhram in its district (Khlong Rop Krung is the dividing line), and Bang Yi Khan in Bang Phlat District (across the Chao Phraya River).

Places
Wat Sam Phraya
Wat Sangwet
Wat Noranarthsoontarikaram
Thewet Pier (N15)
Bank of Thailand (BOT) and Bang Khun Phrom with Devavesm Palaces
Phra Nakhon District Office
Cooperative Promotion Department (CPD)
Rama VIII Bridge (share with nearby subdistricts)

Notes

Phra Nakhon district
Subdistricts of Bangkok